Umpai Mutaporn (born 16 January 1985) is a Thai professional footballer.

Honours

Club
Sriracha 
 Thai Division 1 League Champions (1) : 2010

External links
 Goal.com 
 

1985 births
Living people
Umpai Mutaporn
Umpai Mutaporn
Association football midfielders
Umpai Mutaporn
Umpai Mutaporn
Umpai Mutaporn
Umpai Mutaporn
Umpai Mutaporn
Umpai Mutaporn
Umpai Mutaporn